Kenar Marg (also Romanized as Kenār Marg and Kenār Merreg) is a village in Sar Firuzabad Rural District, Firuzabad District, Kermanshah County, Kermanshah Province, Iran. At the 2006 census, its population was 169, in 35 families.

References 

Populated places in Kermanshah County